Kota Iskandar Highway (Johor state road J239) is a major highway in Iskandar Puteri, Johor, Malaysia. It connects the town of Gelang Patah to Kota Iskandar.

Lists of interchanges

See also
 Transport in Malaysia

Expressways and highways in Johor
Roads in Iskandar Puteri